Ustad Tanveer Ahmed Khan (born 1976) is an Indian vocalist in the Hindustani classical tradition, from the Delhi Gharana (school). He sings Khyal, Thumri, Dadra, Tappa, Tarana, Bhajans and Ghazals.

References

1976 births
Living people
Singers from Delhi
Hindustani singers
21st-century Indian male classical singers